Turris, Latin for "Tower", is a genus of sea snails.

It may also refer to:

 Turris Libisonis, the Roman name for Porto Torres in northern Sardinia
 Turris, a genus of sea snails
 Turris Omnia, an open source hardware network router
 S.S. Turris Calcio, an Italian football club
 Kyle Turris (born 1989), a Canadian ice hockey player